Drunen is a town in the municipality of Heusden in the southern Netherlands. Since 1813, Drunen had been a separate municipality, consisting of the towns Drunen, Elshout, and Giersbergen. Drunen's population reached 18,216.

Built environment
There are a number of pubs and stores also located in the middle of town. 

Drunen was heavily shelled by British Forces in late 1944 in the days prior to liberation and its main buildings were heavily damaged or destroyed outright. In consequence, there are few historic buildings. In 2007 the downtown area, including the plaza, was modernized.

Municipal merger
On 1 January 1997, Drunen was incorporated, along with the municipalities of Heusden and Vlijmen, into the new, enlarged municipality of Heusden, containing the towns Drunen, Elshout, Giersbergen, Heesbeen, Doeveren, Hedikhuizen, Herpt, Oud-Heusden, Heusden, Vlijmen, Nieuwkuijk and Haarsteeg. Some argued that this enlarged municipality should have been called the municipality of Drunen, being the biggest of the three towns. However, due to the historical importance of Heusden, and possibly to avoid ill-will in the almost equally large town of Vlijmen, the municipality was named after Heusden.

History
 1813: Drunen becomes a municipality in the Kingdom of the Netherlands
 1935: Elshout (previously part of the municipality Oud-Heusden) is added to Drunen
 1944: Liberation of Drunen in World War II at which the church tower and many of the historic buildings are destroyed
 1997: The municipality of Drunen is incorporated into the enlarged municipality of Heusden
 2007: The modernized centre of Drunen is officially opened

Economy
Drunen has an extensive industrial park which includes heavy industry for large ship's propellers, as well as copper and aluminium extrusion.  Most recent industries focus on logistics. The biggest employers in Drunen are the propeller factory Wärtsilä (previously John Crane Group-LIPS) and the aluminium factory of the Sapa Group (previously Alcoa).

Recreation
Drunen is internationally known for the  National Park,  ('Loon and Drunen Dunes'), consisting of dunes and forests that attracts many tourists. To emphasize the link between Drunen and the Dunes, at the opening of the modernized town center, a piece of art was unveiled which contains excerpts of a poem about the dunes.

An historic car and vehicle museum ("Autotron") was located in Drunen until 1987. The building was designed by architect Anton Pieck (known from the Efteling). It is currently used as a theatre and arts facility, highlighting different music, dance and art groups. In 1987, the Autotron collection moved to Rosmalen until 2003, since when it has become part of the Louwman Museum's collection in The Hague. 

A theme park called Land van Ooit was located in Drunen as well. However, on 22 November 2007 the park closed.

Notable people
 Jay Hardway (Jobke Heiblom), DJ/Producer and drummer.

 Jolijn van de Wiel, child actress
 Michiel van der Heijden, mountainbiker and cyclo cross rider
 Paul van Loon, author
 Mike Williams (DJ), future house, future bounce producer and dj
 Zanger Kafke, Folk Singer

See also

References

Municipalities of the Netherlands disestablished in 1997
Populated places in North Brabant
Former municipalities of North Brabant
Heusden